Count Henry of Stolberg-Wernigerode (25 September 1772 in Wernigerode Castle – 16 February 1854 in Wernigerode Castle) succeeded his father in 1824 as ruler of the County of Wernigerode.

Life 
Count Henry was the eldest son of Count Christian Frederick of Stolberg-Wernigerode (1746–1824) and Countess Auguste Eleonore of Stolberg-Stolberg (1748–1821).  He was a member from the noble family of the Counts of Stolberg.

Henrich zu Stolberg-Wernigerode was educated by private tutors and studied until 1790 (with an interruption in 1789 by the turmoil of revolution) in Strasbourg.  He then continued his studies in Göttingen.  After completing his studies, he devoted himself to the administration of his territories.  After his attempts to prevent the mediatization of his house as part of Reichsdeputationshauptschluss had failed, he sided with Napoléon Bonaparte, and became Oberstallmeister in the Kingdom of Westphalia.  From 1808 to 1813 he was a member of the Diet the Kingdom of Westphalia.

From 1813 to 1815, he served the General Government between the Weser and the Rhine as administrator of the district of Osterwieck (the General Government was a temporary province of Prussia, to administer the territories that had been liberated from French occupation during the War of the Sixth Coalition).  During the Congress of Vienna, all of the territories of the County of Stolberg were awarded to count Henry.

From 1825 he was a member of the Prussian State Council.  From 1825 to 1854 he was also a member of the provincial Council of the Prussian Province of Saxony; from 1847 to 1848 he was a member of the United Diet of the Prussian provinces.  From 1824 to 1854, he ruled over the county of Wernigerode in the district of Magdeburg of the Prussian province of Saxony.  As a nobleman, he was a hereditary member of the First Chamber of the States General in the Kingdom of Hanover and also in the Grand Duchy of Hesse.  Count Henry was canon of the cathedral in Halberstadt, Knight of the Prussian Royal  Order of the Black Eagle and a member of the Order of Saint John.

In 1853 he purchased the House Bruch, a manor near Hattingen.  The Henrichshütte factory in Hattingen was named after him.  This factory started operations in 1854, the year Henry died.

Marriages and issue 
On 4 August 1799 he married his first wife, Princess Johanna (Jenny) von Schönburg-Waldenburg (4 October 1780-29. August 1809).  

On 30 December 1810, he married his second wife, Baroness Eberhardine von der Reck, the daughter of the Prussian State Minister Eberhard von der Reck (25 January 1785 – 24 October 1852.).

His children from his first marriage with Princess Jenny von Schönburg-Waldenburg:
 Countess Eleonore (1801–1827), married in 1819 Prince Henry LXIII, Prince Reuss of Köstritz
 Hermann (1802–1841), Count of Stolberg-Wernigerode, married in 1831 Emma Countess of Erbach-Fürstenau (1811-1889, great-granddaughter of George Albert III, Count of Erbach-Fürstenau); their child was Otto of Stolberg-Wernigerode
 Count Bernhard (1803–1824)
 Count Botho (1805–1881), married in 1843 Countess Adelheid of Erbach-Fürstenau (1822-1881, sister of the aforementioned Emma)
 Countess Caroline (1806–1899), married in 1828 Prince Henry LXIII, Prince Reuss of Köstritz
 Count Eduard and Count Christoph (twins; 1808-1808)
 Count Rudolph (1809–1867), married in 1851 Auguste Countess of Stolberg-Wernigerode (1823-1864)

References 
 Count Henry of Stolberg-Wernigerode: Tagebuch über meinen Aufenthalt in Wien zur Zeit des Congresses vom 9. September 1814 bis zum April 1815, edited by Doris Derdey, with an introduction by Konrad Breitenborn and Uwe Lagatz, Halle, 2004, .
 Uwe Lagatz: Zwischen Ancien Régime und Modernisierung: Graf Henrich zu Stolberg-Wernigerode (1772-1854), Halle, 2003, .
 Jochen Lengemann: 'Biographisches Handbuch der Reichsstände des Königreichs Westphalen und der Ständeversammlung des Großherzogtums Frankfurt, Frankfurt am Main 1991, page 195.
 Uwe Lagatz: Zeitenwende. Graf Christian Friedrich (1746–1824) und Graf Henrich (1772–1854) zu Stolberg-Wernigerode, in: Philipp Fürst zu Stolberg-Wernigerode and Jost-Christian Fürst zu Stolberg-Stolberg (Eds.): Stolberg 1210–2010: Zur achthundertjährigen Geschichte des Geschlechts'', Dößel, 2010, p. 220-245.
 

Halberstadt
1772 births
1854 deaths
People from Wernigerode
House of Stolberg
Henry
German landowners